A six-hour tornado outbreak of 24 tornadoes impacted Indiana, Ohio, and Ontario on August 24, 2016. Several of these tornadoes were strong and caused significant damage, including a high-end EF2 tornado that struck Windsor, Ontario, Canada and an EF3 tornado that struck Kokomo, Indiana. This particular tornado outbreak was unusual for multiple reasons, including the fact that it was largely unexpected. The Storm Prediction Center had issued only a slight risk for severe weather that day, with the threat for a tornado or two limited to parts of Kansas, Missouri, Iowa, and Illinois. Despite this, the outbreak unfolded entirely outside of the outlined threat area as numerous supercell thunderstorms developed unexpectedly across parts of the Great Lakes and Ohio Valley, producing numerous tornadoes. Tornado outbreaks of this size and intensity are also not commonly seen during the late summer months across the Ohio Valley region. Despite the damage, no fatalities occurred.

Meteorological synopsis
The tornado outbreak of August 24 was not expected. That morning, the Storm Prediction Center (SPC) issued a level 2/Slight risk of severe weather stretching from northeastern Kansas into western Illinois. However, areas from northern Indiana to northwestern Ohio, where the brunt of tornadic activity occurred later in the day, were only in a level 1/Marginal risk; this risk area was for the threat of damaging winds, as the probability of a tornado within  of a point across Indiana and Ohio was under 2 percent. Throughout the morning and early afternoon hours, several bands of shower and thunderstorm activity overspread Illinois and Indiana, fueled by a boundary separating warmer temperatures to the south and cooler temperatures to the north. With convective available potential energy (CAPE) values around 2,000 J/kg, dewpoints in the low to mid-70s °F, and sufficient vertical wind shear along the boundary, the environment seemed supportive of severe thunderstorms, prompting the SPC to expand the Slight risk eastward into southern Illinois and Indiana. Still, areas across northern Indiana into lower Michigan and Ohio remained in a Marginal risk, as the cloud shield associated with a mesoscale convective vortex over northwestern Illinois was expected to limit instability in these areas.

Over the ensuing hours, unusual convective trends unfolded. While the morning line of storms across Illinois and Indiana dissipated, a secondary and more robust cluster of storms developed across eastern Illinois and progressed east by the early afternoon. Typically, discrete supercells congeal into squall lines as storms mature. In this case, however, the line of storms broke down into individual supercells as they tracked across northern Indiana and northwestern Ohio, marking the start of a short-duration but significant tornado outbreak. The first tornado touched down west of Indianapolis, Indiana, at 18:38 UTC (1:38 p.m. CDT). Shortly thereafter, the SPC issued a localized tornado watch for Indiana and Ohio, despite expressing uncertainty over whether one would be needed just an hour before. As the original round of tornado-producing supercells continued east, additional supercells developed throughout the afternoon hours. By the end of the day, a total of 24 tornadoes occurred across Indiana, Ohio, and Ontario in Canada, including a pair of EF3 tornadoes in southern Kokomo, Indiana, and near Woodburn, Indiana. In addition to the rare convective evolution and unexpected nature of the event, it was notable in that large tornado outbreaks are an unusual occurrence in late August.

Confirmed tornadoes

August 24 event

See also
List of North American tornadoes and tornado outbreaks

Notes

References 

Tornadoes in Ohio
Tornadoes in Ontario
Tornadoes of 2016
2016 in Ohio
2016 in Indiana
2016 in Ontario
August 2016 events in North America
Tornadoes in Indiana
2016-08-24